Celo may refer to:

 Celo Community, a communal settlement in the Western mountains of North Carolina
 Camp Celo, a privately owned Quaker-based summer camp in Celo Community
 Alain Celo (born 1960), French composer and violist

See also 
 Čelo (disambiguation)
 Çelo (born 1977), Albanian singer and model
 Celos (disambiguation)
 Cello (disambiguation)
 Chelo (disambiguation)
 Cielo (disambiguation)